The 2020–21 Biathlon World Cup – Stage 3 was the third event of the season and was held in Hochfilzen, Austria, from 11 to 13 December 2020.

Schedule of events 
The events took place at the following times.

Medal winners

Men

Women

Achievements 

 Best individual performance for all time
Not include World Championships and Olympic Games

 , 1st place in Sprint
 , 18th place in Sprint
 , 45th place in Sprint
 , 72nd place in Sprint
 , 82nd place in Sprint
 , 93rd place in Sprint
 , 101st place in Sprint
 , 12th place in Sprint
 , 12th place in Sprint
 , 51st place in Pursuit
 , 52nd place in Pursuit
 , 64th place in Sprint
 , 65th place in Sprint
 , 77th place in Sprint
 , 80th place in Sprint

 First individual World Cup race

 , 82nd place in Sprint
 , 101st place in Sprint
 , 91st place in Sprint
 , 96th place in Sprint
 , 107nd place in Sprint

References 

Biathlon World Cup - Stage 3, 2020-21
2020–21 Biathlon World Cup
Biathlon competitions in Austria
Biathlon World Cup